The Gwent Police and Crime Commissioner is the police and crime commissioner for the Gwent Police area. The post was created in November 2012, following an election held on 15 November 2012, and replaced the Gwent Police Authority. The current incumbent is Jeff Cuthbert, who represents the Labour Party.

List of Gwent Police and Crime Commissioners

References

Police and crime commissioners in Wales